The Konadaha Seneca First Nation is a Seneca First Nation in southern Ontario, and is a member nation of the Six Nations of the Grand River. Its reserves include the shared reserves of Glebe Farm 40B and the Six Nations of the Grand River First Nation.

Seneca tribe
First Nations governments in Ontario